Machinda is a town in Equatorial Guinea. It is located in the province of Litoral and has a (2005 est.) population of 2897.

The average elevation of Machinda is 631 meters. 

Populated places in Litoral (Equatorial Guinea)